S.V. Walking Boyz Company also SV WBC or WBC, is a Surinamese association football club based in Paramaribo. They have won the Surinamese Hoofdklasse title three times. The club play at the Essed Stadion with a capacity of 3,500 spectators, which is also the National Stadium and is shared with several clubs.

History 
Walking Boyz Company were founded on 16 January 1997 in Paramaribo. Seven years later the team won its first national championship, winning the first Championship-Super Cup double in Suriname in 2004. WBC went on to win two more national titles in 2006 and 2009, winning the Super Cup (Suriname President's Cup) as well on both occasions.

Due to their results, the club were able to participate in the CFU Club Championship, the International Caribbean club competition which leads to qualification for the CONCACAF Champions League. Their best result was a second round finish of the tournament on two occasions. Losing to Joe Public from Trinidad and Tobago in 2010, and to the Puerto Rico Islanders in the 2011 edition.

Roster

First team squad 

as of 30 March 2011

List Of Coaches 
 Andy Atmodimedjo (2003–05)
 Roy Vanenburg (2007–10)
 Jimmy Hoepel (2010–12)

Results

International Competitions 

 2010 CFU Club Championship
First Round v.  Defense Force – 2:1
First Round v.  Alpha United – 1:1
First Round v.  Centre Bath Estate – 3:0
Second Round v.  Joe Public – 0:5
Second Round v.  System 3 – 2:0

 2011 CFU Club Championship
First Stage v.  Northern United All Stars – 3:1, 3:0
Second Stage v.  Puerto Rico Islanders – 1:1, 0:7

Honours

National 
Hoofdklasse: 3
 2004, 2006, 2009

Beker van Suriname: 1
 2009

Suriname President's Cup: 3
 2004, 2006, 2009

Other 
Paramaribo Cup: 3
2007, 2008, 2009

References 

Walking Boyz Company
Walking Boyz Company
Walking Boyz Company
Association football clubs established in 1997